Vypolzovo is a former Russian Air Force airbase located near Ozyorny, Tver Oblast, Russia.

The base was home to the:
 139th Guards Fighter Aviation Regiment PVO between 1948 and 1950 with the Yakovlev Yak-9.
 760th Fighter Aviation Regiment between 1945 and 1946 with the Lavochkin La-7.
 435th Fighter Aviation Regiment between 1945 and 1946 with the La-7.
 145th Guards Fighter Aviation Regiment PVO between 1948 and 1950 with the La-7.
 566th Transport Aviation Regiment between 1947 and 1958 with the Lisunov Li-2.
 334th Transport Aviation Regiment between 1946 and 1948 with the Li-2.
 147th Guards Fighter Aviation Regiment PVO between 1948 and 1952 with the Mikoyan-Gurevich MiG-15.
 47th Independent Guards Reconnaissance Aviation Regiment between 1946 and 1947 with the Petlyakov Pe-2.
 29th Independent Helicopter Squadron of the Strategic Rocket Forces between 1968 and 1997. It supported the 7th Guards Rocket Division.

References

Russian Air Force bases
Military installations established in the 1940s